Desmond Foley (12 September 1940 – 5 February 1995) was an Irish Gaelic footballer and hurler of the 1950s and 1960s. He was also a politician and represented Fianna Fáil in Dáil Éireann.

Sports
Desmond Foley was born into a farming family at Kinsealy, County Dublin in 1940. As a young man he showed particular skill at Gaelic games, winning four Dublin County Senior Hurling Championships with the St Vincents GAA club, having earlier captained the school team of St Joseph's, Fairview which brought the All-Ireland Colleges football title to Dublin for the first time.  Foley captained the Dublin minor football team which won the All-Ireland Final in 1958. In 1962 he became the only player in history to play in two provincial Railway Cup finals, in hurling and football, on the same day, winning medals in both codes for Leinster. He won further Railway Cup medals again in 1964 and 1965.

Foley was a prominent member of the Dublin county hurling team from 1958 until 1969, playing on the losing side in the 1961 All-Ireland Senior Hurling Championship Final. In 1963 he captained the Dublin county football team which defeated Galway to win the All-Ireland title.  He won three All-Star awards, two for football and one for hurling, but never a senior All-Ireland hurling medal. He was a mid-fielder of the highest ranking, particularly noted for his outstanding sportsmanship. His brother Lar Foley was a team colleague, both in hurling and football, through most of his campaigns in the 1950s and 60s and who was also an All-Ireland medal winner for Gaelic football in 1958 and 1963.

Politics
Towards the end of his playing career, Foley became interested in politics and was elected to Dáil Éireann as a Fianna Fáil Teachta Dála (TD) for the Dublin County constituency at the 1965 general election, and in the Dublin County North constituency at the 1969 general election. He resigned from the Fianna Fáil parliamentary party on 4 November 1971, in advance of a confidence motion in Jim Gibbons, whose role in the Arms Crisis he disagreed with. He unsuccessfully contested the 1973 general election in Dublin County North as an Independent candidate.

Des Foley died in Dublin in 1995.

References

1940 births
1995 deaths
All-Ireland-winning captains (football)
Dual players
Dublin inter-county Gaelic footballers
Dublin inter-county hurlers
Fianna Fáil TDs
Irish sportsperson-politicians
Members of the 18th Dáil
Members of the 19th Dáil
Politicians from County Dublin
Politicians from Fingal
Sportspeople from Fingal
St Vincents (Dublin) Gaelic footballers
St Vincents (Dublin) hurlers
People educated at St. Joseph's CBS, Fairview